Brad Marchand (born May 11, 1988) is a Canadian professional ice hockey left winger and alternate captain for the Boston Bruins of the National Hockey League (NHL). The Bruins selected Marchand in the third round, 71st overall, of the 2006 NHL Entry Draft. 

Marchand was raised in Hammonds Plains, Nova Scotia, the oldest of four children born to two local hockey coaches. As a child, he was known for his short temper, seeing a sport psychologist and taking anger management classes to address his frustrations. He also became close friends with future NHL player Andrew Bodnarchuk, playing with him on both a minor ice hockey team and for Madeline Symonds Middle School. Between 2004 and 2008, Marchand played for three junior ice hockey teams: he was drafted by the Moncton Wildcats, was traded to the Val-d'Or Foreurs in 2006, and was traded again to the Halifax Mooseheads in 2007. At the same time, the Bruins were scouting Marchand, and made a trade with the New York Islanders to ensure that he was drafted by Boston in 2006.

After Halifax fell to the Gatineau Olympiques in the 2009 QMJHL championships, with Marchand a healthy scratch for their elimination game, the Bruins told Marchand to stay home and report that fall for training camp. He spent the 2008–09 AHL season with the Providence Bruins before making his NHL debut in October 2009. Marchand was a member of the Bruins' starting roster in 2010, playing on the fourth line and helping the Bruins win the 2011 Stanley Cup Finals. Marchand and the Bruins struggled in the next several seasons, first when a lockout shortened the 2012–13 NHL season, followed by two consecutive playoff misses. Meanwhile, Marchand was increasing both his number of goals per season and his reputation as a pest.

During the 2017–18 NHL season, Marchand received a series of fines, suspensions, and media controversies for hits on his opponent. He decided after the season to focus on improving his character, and followed through by scoring 100 points during the 2018–19 NHL season. Marchand's high-scoring season was undercut by a disappointing defeat at the 2019 Stanley Cup Finals, and as he moved into the 2019–20 NHL season, Marchand focused on setting up scoring chances for linemates Patrice Bergeron and David Pastrňák.  However, Marchand's reputation of suspensions and rule-breaking behavior continued in the 2021–22 NHL season, as he was suspended a total of nine games in that season alone.

Early life 
Marchand was born on May 11, 1988, in Hammonds Plains, Nova Scotia, a suburb of the Halifax Regional Municipality. Marchand was the oldest of four children born to Kevin and Lynn Marchand, with all of his siblings born in a four-year span. His father was known as a goon during his junior ice hockey years, at one time engaging in 40 fights within a 40-game span. After collecting 358 penalty minutes in one season, Kevin Marchand's coach taught him how to balance the physical aspect of the game with skill and scoring, a lesson which he in turn taught his children as they began their hockey careers. Marchand began playing hockey at the age of two in Lower Sackville, Nova Scotia, and developed an aggressive playing style from a young age. He remembers beginning to fight in games around the age of 13 as an outlet for his excessive energy. The following year, he hit an opponent with enough force to damage the cage on the player's helmet. Marchand struggled with his temper throughout his childhood, and took anger management classes as an adolescent. As his hockey career progressed, he would also begin seeing a sport psychologist to address his on-ice frustrations.

Growing up, Marchand became close friends with future National Hockey League (NHL) player Andrew Bodnarchuk, a fellow Hammonds Plains native and his minor ice hockey teammate for the Dartmouth Subways of the Timberlea Amateur Sports Association. Marchand also played for his school team at Madeline Symonds Middle School alongside Bodnarchuk. Marchand gained a reputation both for taking penalties and for riling his opponents during his minor hockey career, and he formed intense rivalries both with his Cole Harbour rivals and with his larger, stronger teammates.

Playing career

Amateur

The Moncton Wildcats of the Quebec Major Junior Hockey League (QMJHL) selected Marchand 24th overall in the 2004 QMJHL Entry Draft. He scored 29 goals for Moncton in his draft year, and was awarded the team's Rookie of the Year. Shortly before the 2005-06 QMJHL season, Moncton hired Ted Nolan as their new head coach, and he took to Marchand's "drive and determination" at once, giving the skater an extensive role on the team. Under this new direction, Marchand scored 29 goals and 66 points in 68 regular season games for Moncton, and led the team to a President's Cup championship and the Memorial Cup finals with another five goals and 14 assists in 20 playoff games. The Wildcats ultimately lost in the finals to the Quebec Remparts. The Boston Bruins of the NHL spent the season scouting Marchand, and traded two fourth-round picks in the 2006 NHL Entry Draft to the New York Islanders in exchange for a third-round pick, which they used to select Marchand 71st overall. Marchand signed an entry-level contract with the team in October 2007.

On January 2, 2006, the Wildcats traded Marchand and two draft picks to the Val-d'Or Foreurs in exchange for Luc Bourdon, Jean-Sebastien Adam, and Ian Mathieu-Girard, with Marchand's part of the trade going into effect just before the 2006–07 QMJHL season. He scored 33 goals and 47 assists in 57 regular-season games with Val-d'Or, and in that season's playoffs, he led the league with 16 goals and 24 assists in 20 games. At the same time, he showed signs of being a grinder, putting up 36 penalty minutes. Although the Lewiston Maineiacs swept the Foreurs in the Memorial Cup finals, Maineiacs skater David Perron and goaltender Jonathan Bernier saw a threat in Marchand, both for his offensive ability and the way in which he frustrated his opponents. He returned to the Foreurs the following season, putting up 21 goals and 23 assists in 33 games.

On December 17, 2007, the first day of the QMJHL trading window, the Foreurs traded Marchand to the Halifax Mooseheads in exchange for forward Maxime Sauve and five future draft picks, including two in the first round. Earlier that day, Halifax had acquired Sauve from the Quebec Remparts in exchange for centre David Gilbert. When the Foreurs had first approached Marchand about potential trades, he had been eager to join his hometown team, where his childhood friends Hillier and Bodnarchuk were already playing. He played in 26 regular-season games for Halifax, putting up 29 points in the process, before leading the team with 18 postseason points in 14 games. After the Mooseheads lost three straight semifinal games to the Gatineau Olympiques, however, Halifax head coach Cam Russell made Marchand a healthy scratch for Game 4, which Halifax ultimately lost as well.

Boston Bruins (2009–present)

2008–2010: AHL years 

After the Mooseheads' loss in the QMJHL playoffs, the Bruins told Marchand that, rather than joining the team for the remainder of their season, he would be invited to summer training camp. Marchand was frustrated with the decision, which was rumoured to be due to his on-ice attitude, and he entered the Bruins' 2008 training camp looking to rebuild his reputation and establish himself as a strong player. He played the 2008–09 season with the Providence Bruins, Boston's American Hockey League (AHL) affiliate, where he finished second in scoring among all AHL rookies with 18 goals and 41 assists in 79 games. That scoring continued into the playoffs, where Marchand added another seven goals and eight assists in 16 games. The Providence Bruins advanced to the final four of the 2009 Calder Cup playoffs, where they were eliminated by the championship-winning Hershey Bears.

Marchand opened the 2009–10 season with Providence, but received his first NHL call-up after scoring six points in his first six games. He made his NHL debut on October 21, 2009, picking up an assist on Michael Ryder's goal against the Nashville Predators. After 11 scoreless games, Boston sent Marchand back down to Providence, where he scored only seven goals in a 28-game stretch. Later in the season, Marchand saw a hot streak of 16 points in 14 AHL games, leading to his second call-up. He skated in 20 NHL games that year, putting up only one assist and 20 penalty minutes.

2010–2013: Stanley Cup championship and lockout 
Originally, Marchand was meant to serve as the Bruins' spare fourth-line forward for the 2010–11 season, with Daniel Paille starting alongside Gregory Campbell and Shawn Thornton. However, a strong training camp performance from Marchand pushed Paille from the starting lineup to the bench, with the latter filling in during brief periods of injury. After scoring his first NHL goal on November 3, 2010, against the Buffalo Sabres, Marchand had a break-out season on the fourth line: by the NHL All-Star Game break, he had scored 13 goals and earned 25 points, and had a +21 plus-minus. Additionally, his four short-handed goals were the most in the NHL. By the end of the regular season, Marchand had 41 points, far fewer than fellow rookies Jeff Skinner, Logan Couture, and Michael Grabner, but he averaged significantly less time on the ice, and when he was asked to play, he was given few opportunities to score. Marchand also earned the first suspension of his NHL career during the season, receiving a two-game penalty on March 17 for elbowing R. J. Umberger of the Columbus Blue Jackets. That year, Marchand was the recipient of the Bruin's Seventh Player Award, given by fans of the New England Sports Network to the player who surpassed expectations. He continued his strong offensive performance into the 2011 Stanley Cup playoffs, scoring 19 points in 25 postseason games, including two goals and one assist in Game 7 of the finals, helping to clinch the championship for Boston. The game before, Marchand was criticized by sportswriters for repeatedly punching Daniel Sedin, an altercation for which he received no penalty. After the fact, reporters asked why Marchand continued to hit Sedin unprovoked, to which he responded, "Because I felt like it." Marchand's 11 playoff goals during the Bruins' 2011 championship run tied Jeremy Roenick for the second-most of any NHL rookie.

On September 14, 2011, the Bruins announced that they had re-signed Marchand to a two-year contract, without disclosing the financial terms of the deal. Shortly after, Marchand scored the Bruins' first goal of the 2011-12 NHL season, a backhand pass against the Philadelphia Flyers. Later that season, Marchand scored his first NHL hat trick, scoring three goals and a career-high five points in the Bruins' defeat of the Florida Panthers on December 23, 2011. As the season progressed, Marchand also continued to develop his reputation as a pest. That October, Marchand tried to fight with P. K. Subban of the Montreal Canadiens twice within the same game, only to be broken up by officials both times. On December 12, the NHL fined Marchand $2,500 for slew footing Matt Niskanen of the Pittsburgh Penguins the week prior, a penalty which resulted in an on-ice fight between Marchand and Niskanen. On January 9, 2012, Marchand was suspended for five games and fined over $150,000 for an illegal hit to the head on Sami Salo of the Vancouver Canucks, resulting in a concussion. Marchand and Julien defended the hit, arguing that it was performed in self-defense against Salo, who stood  taller than Marchand. After scoring 28 goals and 55 points during the regular season while playing on a line with Patrice Bergeron and Tyler Seguin, Marchand was moved to the Bruins' "Merlot" line with Campbell and Thornton for the 2012 Stanley Cup playoffs. After battling their way to a Game 7 overtime, the Bruins fell to the Washington Capitals in the Eastern Conference quarterfinals. At the end of the year, Marchand took home both the Elizabeth C. Dufresne Trophy, awarded for outstanding performance during home games, and the John P. Bucyk Award for charitable contributions off the ice.

On September 7, 2012, the Bruins extended Marchand's contract by four more years, with his salary carrying an average annual value of $4.5 million. When the 2012–13 NHL season was indefinitely delayed due to a lockout, many of Marchand's teammates struck deals to play in European hockey leagues, an option that Marchand met with trepidation. He ultimately chose to wait out the lock-out, and did not play professional hockey until the season began in January 2013. Paired with Bergeron and Seguin, both of whom spent the lock-out in the Swiss National League, Marchand worried that he would be out of practice compared to his teammates. He ultimately scored 18 goals and 18 assists in 45 games of the lock-out-shortened season, which in a regular 82-game year anticipated that he would have scored over 30 goals and recorded over 65 points. As the Bruins entered the 2013 Stanley Cup playoffs, Marchand scored his first postseason overtime goal in Game 1 of the Eastern Conference semifinals against the New York Rangers. The Chicago Blackhawks overpowered the Bruins in the 2013 Stanley Cup Finals, defeating a depleted roster in six games.

2013–2016: Scoring and team difficulties 
Going into the 2013–14 season, Marchand struggled to adjust to his new linemate Loui Eriksson, colliding with the other winger during a preseason game against the Winnipeg Jets. Marchand's struggles continued into the regular season, with just three goals after the first 20 games of the year. Bruins coach Claude Julien demoted Marchand from the second to the third and fourth lines on several occasions, giving players like Jordan Caron an opportunity to fill his position in the top-six. His decision to taunt the Canucks by kissing his Stanley Cup championship ring in a game that the Bruins lost 6–2 frustrated Julien, who wanted to improve Marchand's scoring while tempering his emotions. By the end of the regular season, Marchand had improved to 25 goals and set a career high of 28 assists, but he voiced disappointment in his own performance, citing a struggle with the mental aspects of hockey. Despite dissatisfaction with his own performance, the Bruins awarded Marchand the 2014 Eddie Shore Award, given to the player who demonstrates "exceptional hustle and determination" throughout the season.

Marchand entered the 2014–15 NHL season having worked on his offseason conditioning and the mental aspects of the game in the hopes that it would break his slump from the previous season. Although the Bruins' season was considered a disappointment, as the team finished the year with only 96 points and missed the playoffs for the first time since 2007, Marchand was a bright spot, leading Boston with 24 total goals and five game-winning goals. He spent the year on the top line with Bergeron and David Krejčí, combining with his two linemates for 50 total goals. After the season, Marchand admitted in an interview that the Bruins had been "a little bit divided", and that there were "different cliques" on the team, which in turn impacted their on-ice performance. He also revealed that he had been battling an elbow injury ever since the 2014 playoffs, and he underwent surgery during the 2015 offseason to repair torn tendons in the area. After the season, 98.5 The Sports Hub named Marchand the Bruins' Third Star of the year, with Bergeron and Rask receiving the first and second stars, respectively.

The Bruins' offence continued to struggle into the 2015–16 NHL season, when Marchand was indefinitely placed on the injured list. He had been stunned by a collision with Dale Weise of the Canadiens on October 10 and did not return to the game; the Bruins later revealed that Marchand had suffered a concussion from the collision. He ultimately missed two games, returning on October 17 for a match against the Arizona Coyotes. Marchand was on the other side of a suspension in November, when he suffered an illegal check to the head from Colorado Avalanche skater Gabriel Landeskog. Landeskog received a two-game suspension, while Marchand was fined $5,000 for throwing a punch after the incident. The next month, Marchand received a suspension of his own for clipping Mark Borowiecki of the Ottawa Senators. Because Marchand was considered a repeat offender, he was penalized with three games and over $150,000. During a home game on February 6, 2016, Marchand was allowed an overtime penalty shot against the Buffalo Sabres when defenceman Rasmus Ristolainen dropped his stick to grab Marchand and prevent a shot. Marchand successfully made the shot for the first overtime penalty-shot goal in franchise history. While the Bruins missed the playoffs once again with a regular season tiebreaker loss to the Ottawa Senators, Marchand set a career-high 37 goals during the 2015–16 season. He also received his second Seventh Player Award, as voted by fans of the New England Sports Network.

2016–2018: Suspensions and pest reputation 
On September 26, 2016, the Bruins signed Marchand to an eight-year, $49 million contract extension that would carry through the 2024–25 NHL season. The contract carried an annual average value of $6.125 million. Marchand opened the 2016–17 season with a scoring rush, putting up two goals and five points in the first game of the season, followed by four points in the next three games. After leading the Bruins in scoring for the first half of the season, putting up 13 goals and 22 assists in 43 games, Marchand received his first selection to the NHL All-Star Game in January 2017. He nearly missed the game after meeting with the Department of Player Safety for a "dangerous trip" of Niklas Kronwall of the Detroit Red Wings, but ultimately received a $10,000 fine and no suspension. On March 14, Marchand scored the second hat trick of his NHL career, with three goals in the third period of a 6–3 win over Vancouver. After putting up 85 points in the regular season, Marchand missed the final two games of the year with a suspension for spearing Jake Dotchin of the Tampa Bay Lightning. The Bruins' 4–0 victory in that game helped them clinch a berth in the 2017 Stanley Cup playoffs. The Bruins fell to the Ottawa Senators in the first round, with Marchand scoring only one goal in the six-game series. At the end of the year, Marchand received his first NHL first All-Star team selection, while the Bruins awarded him both the Elizabeth C. Dufresne Trophy and the team's Third Star.

After having a break-out season in 2016–17, Marchand intended to double down on his consistent offensive production for the 2017–18 NHL season. His athletic abilities that season, however, were largely overshadowed by his on-ice behaviour. In January 2018, Marchand received a five-game suspension from the NHL for an elbow to the head of Devils skater Marcus Johansson, who suffered a concussion from the play. It was the ninth time that Marchand had received either a fine or suspension from the Department of Player Safety. Despite the 2018 All-Star Game taking place in the midst of Marchand's suspension, he was allowed to take part in the game and skills competition at Amalie Arena, where he was subject to booing from fans in attendance. On March 9, 2018, after receiving a previous warning about embellishing his reaction to a hit in an attempt to draw penalties, Marchand was fined $2,000 for embellishing a tripping penalty by Olli Maatta of the Penguins. The following day, Marchand collided with Blackhawks skater Anthony Duclair, causing the latter a season-ending leg injury. Duclair told reporters that Marchand had reached out to him after the injury, but that it was still a "pretty dirty" play. On April 2, Marchand received his second fine in the span of a month, with a $5,000 penalty for cross-checking Andrew MacDonald of the Philadelphia Flyers. That same season, Marchand scored the third hat trick of his career with an overtime shot against the Red Wings. The last goal was also his 11th regular-season overtime goal, passing Glen Murray's record for the most among the Bruins since overtime was reinstated during the 1983-84 NHL season. Marchand took home the Elizabeth C. Dufresne Trophy for the second year in a row, and was moved from the Bruins' Third Star to Second at the end-of-year awards ceremony.

Marchand's on-ice behaviour came to a head during the 2018 Stanley Cup playoffs, when the NHL placed him on notice for kissing and licking his opponents, behaviour that the league deemed "unacceptable" while warning that "similar behavior in the future will be dealt with by way of supplemental discipline". Marchand's habit was first noticed during a November 2017 game against the Maple Leafs, when he leaned in to kiss Leo Komarov on the cheek rather than fighting him. During Game 1 of the first-round playoff series between Toronto and Boston, Marchand licked Komarov on the face, joking to reporters, "I just wanted to get close to him." He and the NHL both denied that licking Komarov had led to any warning or disciplinary action from the league. Instead, the warning came during the second round of playoffs, when he licked Ryan Callahan of the Tampa Bay Lightning on the face. After receiving the warning, Marchand told reporters that he was going to "really take a pretty hard look in the mirror" and improve "some character things". After the Bruins were eliminated from the playoffs, the team revealed that several skaters had been playing through injuries, with Marchand having suffered a groin injury that affected him for the final six to seven games. Despite his injury and controversies, Marchand scored 85 points in 68 regular-season games and added another 17 points in 12 playoff appearances.

2018–present: 100-point season and All-Star team selections 
In the opening game of the Bruins' 2018–19 season, Marchand became frustrated with Capitals forward Lars Eller's post-goal celebration, fighting the skater hard enough to bloody him. Marchand was ejected from the game with fighting and instigator penalties, as well as a 10-minute game misconduct. In his next game, Marchand tied his career high four assists in a game as part of a 4–0 shutout against the Buffalo Sabres. He continued to generate offensive power throughout the season, and on March 31, 2019, Marchand scored the 26th shorthanded goal of his career, breaking Rick Middleton's franchise record. In the following game against the Columbus Blue Jackets on April 3, Marchand scored his 100th point of the season, becoming the tenth player in franchise history to reach the mark and the first Bruin since Joe Thornton during the 2002–03 season. For his performance, Marchand received an NHL second All-Star team selection, as well as his third consecutive Elizabeth C. Dufresne Trophy and the Bruins' First Star. On May 1, as Boston and Columbus faced each other again during the 2019 Stanley Cup playoffs, Marchand came under fire for a punch to the back of Scott Harrington's head, which ultimately did not result in a suspension. Marchand could not carry his regular-season scoring power into the 2019 Stanley Cup Finals, scoring only two goals and carrying a −2 rating. The Bruins took the St. Louis Blues to seven games, falling 4–1 in the final, while Marchand took responsibility for part of his team's loss. At the end of the first period of Game 7, with less than 15 seconds remaining before intermission, Marchand skated to the bench to signal for a line change, allowing Jaden Schwartz and Alex Pietrangelo of the Blues to skate by him, with the latter scoring a goal against Tuukka Rask.

Marchand and the Bruins opened the 2019–20 NHL season with a desire to move past the previous season's Stanley Cup finals and to continue the discipline that Marchand had been practicing in recent years. On October 27, the BergeronMarchandDavid Pastrňák line combined for a total of 13 points against the New York Rangers. While Bergeron scored his fifth career hat trick, Marchand and Pastrňák put up five points apiece, becoming the first pair of Bruins teammates to do so since Joe Thornton and Glen Murray in 2001. The following month, Marchand became the 11th Bruins skater to reach 600 career points, with a first-period goal against Carey Price of the Montreal Canadiens. Marchand and his linemates kept up their scoring pace throughout the season, and when the NHL suspended operations in March 2020 due to the COVID-19 pandemic, Marchand was sixth in the NHL with 87 points. While playing on the top line that season, Marchand became a playmaker, setting up goals for Bergeron and Pastrňák. Although he had only 28 goals in the regular season, Marchand compiled 59 assists, the fifth-highest in the NHL for the year and the highest on the Bruins. 26 of Pastrňák's 48 regular-season goals had assists from Marchand, including 18 primary assists. During the pause, Marchand was concerned that the NHL would attempt to resume operations too quickly, leading to "really, really ugly" games as unprepared skaters began playing without sufficient practice time. When the NHL resumed operations for the 2020 Stanley Cup playoffs in July, Marchand was one of 31 Bruins invited to play in the Toronto quarantine "bubble". Despite Marchand scoring six goals in as many games during the playoffs, the Bruins fell to the Tampa Bay Lightning in the Eastern Conference semifinals. At the end of the season, Marchand was named the Bruins' Third Star, while his three-year streak of winning the Elizabeth Dufresne Trophy came to an end when the award went to Pastrňák. The NHL also named Marchand to their 2019–20 second All-Star team.

On September 14, 2020, Marchand underwent a sports hernia surgery that carried an expected four-month recovery time, leaving it in question whether he would be available for the start of the 2020–21 NHL season. Marchand, who revealed that the injury had been causing him pain for two and a half years, ended up on track to return to the Bruins at full strength for their January 14 home opener against the New Jersey Devils, in which he scored the team's first goal of the season. Shortly prior to the season, Marchand was also named alternate captain of the Bruins, serving alongside David Krejčí as Patrice Bergeron filled the captain vacancy left by Zdeno Chara. On March 27, Marchand was placed on the NHL COVID protocol list, allowing young player Trent Frederic a chance to occupy his position on the top line. He returned after two missed games, revealing that a false positive test had placed him on the list. On May 3, 2021, Marchand played in his 800th NHL game as the Bruins shut out the New Jersey Devils and clinched a berth in the 2021 Stanley Cup playoffs. He was the 13th player in Bruins history to play in 800 or more games for the team. By the end of the regular season, Marchand led the team with 27 goals, 36 assists, and 63 points, as well as four shorthanded goals and five game-winning goals. He was the Bruins' First Star at their awards banquet, and also took home both his fourth Elizabeth Dufresne Trophy and second Eddie Shore Award. Marchand continued to score game-winning goals in the playoffs, first an overtime goal in Game 2 of the first round against the Washington Capitals, followed by another overtime shot in Game 3 of the second round, against the New York Islanders. His Game 2 overtime goal was only 39 seconds into the period, breaking Bobby Orr's 1970 record for the fastest overtime game-winning goal in Bruins postseason history. Orr scored 40 seconds into Game 4 of the 1970 Stanley Cup Finals against the Blues, clinching the Bruins' fourth championship. Marchand scored two goals in the Bruins' Game 6 loss to the Islanders, tying with Peter McNab for the most goals in Bruins elimination games with nine. Although he finished fifth in Hart Trophy voting, with Connor McDavid a unanimous first selection, Marchand was named to the 2021 All-NHL First Team at the end of June.

During the first home game of the Bruins'  season, Marchand scored a goal on a penalty shot that he was awarded after Dallas Stars defenseman Ryan Suter was called for holding on an attempted Marchand breakaway. Marchand became the third player in NHL history to score the first goal of a team's season on a penalty shot, following Mats Sundin in 2006 and Chris Kelly in 2013. On November 29, Marchand received the seventh suspension of his NHL career when he was penalized for three games after slew-footing Oliver Ekman-Larsson of the Canucks. Marchand was not penalized during the game, and Ekman-Larsson was not injured. On December 14, Marchand and Craig Smith were placed into COVID-19 protocols. Four days later and amidst a larger team outbreak, the Boston Bruins' season was suspended through the annual Christmas break. Marchand was suspended for the second time that season and eighth time in his career on February 9, when he received a six-game ban for roughing and high-sticking goaltender Tristan Jarry of the Penguins. In the final minute of the game, which the Bruins lost 4–2, Jarry made a comment to Marchand, who responded by punching the goaltender in the head and hitting him with his stick, earning Marchand a match penalty, which are handed out when the officials deem an "intent to injure". In a press conference on February 11, 2022, Marchand said that he believed his actions were "stupid" but were not "suspension-worthy", and said he was considering appealing the suspension.

On May 27, 2022  Marchand underwent hip arthroscopy and labral repair on both hips and was expected to miss six months where he had a return table around late November of the 2022-23 season. However Marchand returned 1 month early of his initial plan and made his season debut on October 27, 2022, where he scored 2 goals and had an assist in a win vs the Detroit Red Wings.

International play

Marchand first competed internationally for the 2005 World U-17 Hockey Challenge, winning a bronze medal with Team Canada Atlantic. As a prospect, Marchand went on to represent Canada twice at the IIHF World Junior Championship: the 2007 WJC in Sweden, and again at the 2008 WJC in the Czech Republic. Both times, Canada took home a gold medal. After his performance in the 2007 World Juniors, Marchand was named one of four alternate captains for Canada in the 2008 tournament.

As an adult, Marchand was one of three members of the Bruins to attend the 2016 IIHF World Championship in Russia: he represented Canada, while Pastrňák represented the Czech Republic and Providence Bruins skater Frank Vatrano played for Team USA. Canada took first place in the tournament after defeating the previously-undefeated Finnish team in a gold medal match that saw Marchand fight Leo Komarov of the Toronto Maple Leafs. On May 27, 2016, Marchand was named to Team Canada's roster for the 2016 World Cup of Hockey, joined by his teammate Patrice Bergeron. During the tournament, he played on a line with Bergeron and Sidney Crosby of the Penguins, combining for 25 points in six games. Marchand led the tournament with five goals and three assists. His short-handed goal against Team Europe in the World Cup finals clinched a gold medal for Canada, something that Marchand and his teammates hoped would establish the skater as a strong player rather than a pest.

Playing style and criticism

Throughout his NHL career, Marchand has been characterized as a "pest", a hockey player who attempts to frustrate his opponents through physical or verbal attacks and annoyance. Marchand has modelled his behaviour after that of Theo Fleury, a  former pest who was able to leverage the frustration that he caused his opponents into offensive production. Marchand's teammate David Backes called the skater "the motor on [the Bruins]" in a 2019 interview, while coach Bruce Cassidy has noted that, although it may appear undisciplined, many of Marchand's tactics are calculated to get under the target's skin.

Marchand's agitation tactics have drawn criticism from fans and opponents. A 2020 poll of 392 players across the NHL declared Marchand the "dirtiest player in the league", receiving 29 per cent of the vote. In the same player poll, Marchand was voted both the best and worst trash-talker in the NHL, with 25.87 per cent of players voting him as the league's best and 10.59 per cent voting him as the worst. When the Bruins visited the White House in 2011 after their Stanley Cup victory, President of the United States Barack Obama referred to Marchand as a "Little Ball of Hate", a nickname that he has since embraced. His other nicknames include "Rat", inherited from previous Bruins pest Ken Linseman, and "Leg Sweeper", for his frequent tactic of slew footing his opponents.

In recent years, Marchand has tried to move past his reputation as an agitator and focus more on scoring. His first break-out year came during the 2015–16 season, when he scored 37 goals and became a star for the Bruins. That same year, he helped win the gold medal for Canada at the World Cup of Hockey, cementing his reputation as a strong skater and goal scorer in addition to an agitator. Increased scrutiny from the NHL has also led Marchand to back away from some of his agitation: at the start of the 2017–18 season, Marchand told reporters that he and his teammates were limiting their "chirps" and other trash-talking comments to increase the family-friendly atmosphere of the NHL. After a series of suspensions followed by a highly publicized controversy over Marchand's decision to lick his opponents, the skater made a conscious effort to stay out of trouble during the 2018–19 NHL season, citing a desire "to make sure the longevity is there, that I'm not getting pushed out of the League because of stupidity". In the three seasons following, Marchand has become one of the top-scoring left wings in the NHL, with his 163 assists and 256 points the most of any skater in the position.

Personal life 
Marchand and former Bruins teammate Kevan Miller, both avid crossbow hunters, own an outdoor sports company called March & Mill Co. In November 2020, they purchased a sports outfitter lodge on Beothuk Lake in Newfoundland, with the intention of offering hunting and fishing expeditions in the province.

Marchand married his wife Katrina in September 2015. He has two daughters named Sawyer and Rue and a stepson named Sloane.

Career statistics

Regular season and playoffs
Bold indicates led league

International

Awards, honours and records

Records 
 Most overtime goals in Bruins history (16) 
 Most shorthanded goals in Bruins history (31) 
 Most goals in playoff elimination games in Bruins history. 
 Fastest postseason overtime goal in Bruins history (39 seconds) 
 First overtime penalty-shot goal in Bruins history (February 6, 2016)

See also 
 List of NHL players with 100-point seasons

References

External links

 
 

1988 births
Boston Bruins draft picks
Boston Bruins players
Canadian expatriate ice hockey players in the United States
Canadian ice hockey right wingers
Canadian people of Acadian descent
Halifax Mooseheads players
Ice hockey people from Nova Scotia
Living people
National Hockey League All-Stars
Moncton Wildcats players
Providence Bruins players
Sportspeople from Halifax, Nova Scotia
Stanley Cup champions
Val-d'Or Foreurs players